Trachyglanis sanghensis is a species of loach catfish endemic to the Republic of the Congo where it is found in the Sangha River near Ouesso.  It grows to a length of 5.0 cm.

References 
 

Amphiliidae
Endemic fauna of the Republic of the Congo
Fish described in 1925
Taxa named by Jacques Pellegrin